Revolution Films is a British film production company, founded by producer Andrew Eaton and director Michael Winterbottom. They have produced a number of film and television productions since 1994, including Jude (1996), 24 Hour Party People (2002), 9 Songs (2004), Rush (2013) and The Trip (TV) (2010)

Filmography
Greed (2019, directed by Michael Winterbottom)
The Trip to Spain (2017, directed by Michael Winterbottom)
On the Road (2016, directed by Michael Winterbottom)
The Emperor's New Clothes (2015, directed by Michael Winterbottom)
The Face of an Angel (2014, directed by Michael Winterbottom)
The Trip to Italy (2014, directed by Michael Winterbottom)
Rush (2013, directed by Ron Howard)
The Look of Love (2013, directed by Michael Winterbottom)
360 (2011, directed by Fernando Meirelles)
The Killer Inside Me (2010, directed by Michael Winterbottom)
Genova (2008, directed by Michael Winterbottom)
A Mighty Heart (2007, directed by Michael Winterbottom)
A Cock and Bull Story (2005, directed by Michael Winterbottom)
9 Songs (2004, directed by Michael Winterbottom)
Bright Young Things (2003, directed by Stephen Fry)
Code 46 (2003, directed by Michael Winterbottom)
24 Hour Party People (2002, directed by Michael Winterbottom)
Jude (1996, directed by Michael Winterbottom)

1994 establishments in the United Kingdom